British poetry is the field of British literature encompassing poetry from anywhere in the British world (whether of the British Isles, the British Empire, or the United Kingdom). The term is rarely used, as almost all such poets are clearly identified with one of the various nations or regions within those areas.

Types of poetry which might be considered British poetry include:

English poetry
Irish poetry from Northern Ireland
Scottish poetry (see Scottish literature)
Welsh poetry
Jèrriais poetry
Guernésiais poetry
Manx poetry
Cornish poetry